Second Lieutenant Jesse T. Barrick (January 18, 1841 – November 3, 1923) was an American soldier who fought in the American Civil War. Barrick was awarded the country's highest award for bravery during combat, the Medal of Honor, for his action along the Duck River in Tennessee between May 26 and June 2, 1863. He was honored with the award on March 3, 1917.

Biography
Barrick was born in Ohio but grew up in Minnesota. Barrick, along with his wife, Sarah Ann Strang Barrick, enlisted into the Union Army in 1861. His wife became a nurse in the Union Army. Barrick enlisted at Fort Snelling, Minnesota on 25 October 1861, joining Company H of the Minnesota 3rd Infantry and attained the rank of corporal. It was while he was in the company that he was scouting along the Duck River in Tennessee between May and June 1863. He captured two members of the Confederate army and held them captive for eight days. He was awarded the Medal of Honor on 3 March 1917 for this act.

Barrick mustered out at the conclusion of the Duck River event but later re-enlisted on December 31, 1863 where he was subsequently promoted to second lieutenant on 10 July 1864, commanding a black platoon in the 57th regiment of the U.S. Colored Infantry. He was discharged a few months later, on 15 October 1864 due to a disability.

After the war, he was involved in the fur trade in Suquamish, Kitsap County, Washington, where he had relocated in 1909. He again moved to Pasco in 1912 where he later died on 3 November 1923. He was initially buried in an unmarked grave in the Pasco City Cemetery in Pasco. His remains were later exhumed in February 2000 and interred at Section 8, Grave 108 at the Tahoma National Cemetery. The cemetery's traffic circle is named after Barrick.

Medal of Honor citation

See also

List of American Civil War Medal of Honor recipients: A–F

References

1841 births
1923 deaths
People of Minnesota in the American Civil War
Union Army officers
United States Army Medal of Honor recipients
American Civil War recipients of the Medal of Honor
People from Kitsap County, Washington
People from Pasco, Washington
Burials at Tahoma National Cemetery